Highway 730 is a highway in the Canadian province of Saskatchewan. It runs from Highway 642 near Stony Beach to Regina, where it becomes Dewdney Avenue.

Dewdney Avenue 
Dewdney Avenue is an east–west collector road in central Regina; it is split into two sections by the Canadian Pacific Railway mainline. It is named after Edgar Dewdney, who was Lieutenant-Governor of the North-West Territories who made the decision to move the territorial capital from Battleford to Regina.

Dewdney Avenue begins as a continuation of Highway 730 at the west city limits and passes the Global Transportation Hub and RCMP Academy, Depot Division. East of Lewvan Drive, it passes Evraz Place (formerly known as Regina Exhibition Park), which is the site of Mosaic Stadium. Between Albert Street and Broad Street, Dewdney Avenue passes through the Regina's historic Warehouse District,  just north of downtown. Dewdney Avenue is split by the CPR mainline, between Toronto Street and Winnipeg Street. East of Winnipeg Street, it continues east as a collector road through residential neighbourhoods.

Major intersections 
From west to east:

See also 
Roads in Saskatchewan
Transportation in Saskatchewan

References 

730
Roads in Regina, Saskatchewan